Ilter Tashkin, also spelled as Taşkın İlter, (born on 5 July 1994 in Berlin) is a professional footballer who plays as a midfielder for Turkish club Eyüpspor. Born in Germany, he represents the Azerbaijan national team.

Career

After playing for various youth teams in his hometown of Berlin, Tashkin joined the U19 side of Eintracht Braunschweig during the winter break of the 2012–13 season. For the 2013–14 season he was promoted to the club's reserve side in the Regionalliga Nord. In 2015, he transferred to TSG Neustrelitz in the Regionalliga Nordost.

In July 2016, Tashkin joined Denizlispor.

International career

Despite not having played a professional game in his career, Tashkin was called up to the Azerbaijani senior national team by Berti Vogts in November 2013. There he made his full international debut on 19 November 2013 in a friendly against Kyrgyzstan. After a break of eleven months, he was called up again in October 2014 for Azerbaijan's UEFA Euro 2016 qualifying games against Italy and Croatia.

References

External links 
 
 
 
 

1994 births
Living people
Footballers from Berlin
Azerbaijani footballers
Azerbaijan international footballers
Azerbaijan under-21 international footballers
Azerbaijan youth international footballers
German footballers
Azerbaijani people of Turkish descent
German people of Turkish descent
Association football midfielders
Eintracht Braunschweig II players
Denizlispor footballers
Kardemir Karabükspor footballers
Eyüpspor footballers
TFF First League players
Azerbaijani expatriate footballers
Expatriate footballers in Turkey
Azerbaijani expatriate sportspeople in Turkey